The Zadié river is a tributary of the Ivindo river in northeastern Gabon.

References
 Lerique Jacques. 1983. Hydrographie-Hydrologie. in Geographie et Cartographie du Gabon, Atlas Illustré led by The Ministère de l'Education Nationale de la Republique Gabonaise. Pg 14–15. Paris, France: Edicef.

Rivers of Gabon